Fort Severn, in present-day Annapolis, Maryland, was built in 1808 on the same site as an earlier American Revolutionary War fort of 1776.  Although intended to guard Annapolis harbor from British attack during the War of 1812, it never saw action. The United States Navy acquired Fort Severn and two other military bases from the United States Army on 19 October 1845, for the purpose of housing the new onshore United States Naval Academy. The Academy used the structure for classrooms until its demolition in 1909.

History

American Revolution
The family of Walter Dulany acquired land on the Severn River adjacent Annapolis, Maryland, in 1753. The family and the city of Annapolis contributed land for the construction of a fort during the American Revolutionary War.

Fort Severn: 1808–1845
At a time of worsening tensions between the United States and Great Britain and an embargo against trade, the War Department built Fort Severn as a defense for Annapolis. Located on Windmill Point, Fort Severn offered protection to harbor of Annapolis, which would have been a key target of the British forces. Although constructed as a more substantial fort than the original, this second Fort Severn never saw military action. Americans suspected that the British Army might attack the area during the War of 1812, but no conflict occurred at the fort during the war.

Soldiers continued to garrison Fort Severn after the war. The post surgeon took meteorological observations during 1822. Fort Severn occupied the same 10 acres and several antiquated wooden buildings by 1845.

In 1845, Secretary of War William L. Marcy agreed to transfer Fort Severn to the jurisdiction of Secretary of the Navy George Bancroft, effective 19 October 1845. In so doing, Secretary Bancroft overcame ongoing congressional opposition to an onshore naval school.

Naval Academy use
The Navy turned Fort Severn into a classroom building for the new onshore United States Naval Academy for young naval recruits and midshipmen. The Naval Academy started in October 1845 with 56 midshipmen and seven professors.

The leaders developed a new curriculum requiring midshipmen to study at the Academy for four years (equivalent to classical college education) and to train aboard ships each summer. That format forms the basis of the far more advanced and sophisticated curriculum at the Naval Academy today. The curriculum in the nineteenth century included mathematics and navigation, gunnery and steam, chemistry, English, natural philosophy, and French.

Demolition
Due to deteriorating structure, the Naval Academy demolished the old Fort Severn edifices in 1909. United States Naval Academy expanded in personnel and grandeur. Granite buildings replaced the old wooden structures of Fort Severn. On 28 March 1977, the local chapter of Daughters of the American Revolution (DAR) placed a plaque in remembrance of the original fort at its former site.

References

Footnotes

External links
DAR Fort Severn website

United States Naval Academy
Buildings and structures in Annapolis, Maryland
Demolished buildings and structures in Maryland
Buildings and structures demolished in 1909